A naveta is a form of megalithic chamber tomb unique to the Balearic island of Menorca. They date to the early Bronze Age.
They have two vertical and two corbelled walls giving them the form of an upturned boat, from which the navetas take their name.

The largest example is the Naveta d'Es Tudons which is around 4m high, 14m long and 6.4m wide.

The first author who wrote about these structures was Juan Ramis in his book Celtic antiquities on the island of Menorca, which was edited in 1818, it being the first book in the Spanish language entirely devoted to prehistory.

External links
José Simón Gornés Hachero, Continuidad y cambio en las prácticas funerarias del bronce final y primera edad del hierro en Menorca, e-Spania, 2017
 Guide to Menorca: Prehistory

Burial monuments and structures
Megalithic monuments in Spain
Archaeological sites in Spain
Bronze Age Spain
Prehistory of the Balearic Islands